Esenler is a village in the Amasra District, Bartın Province, Turkey. Its population is 194 (2021).

history 
The village has had the same name since 1928.

Geography 
The village is 38 km from Bartın city center and 22 km from Amasra town centre.

References

Villages in Amasra District